The Cornalvo Dam is a Roman gravity dam in Mérida, Badajoz province, Extremadura, Spain, dating to the 1st or 2nd century AD. The earth dam Roman concrete and stone cladding on the water face is still in use.

It is part of the Archaeological Ensemble of Mérida, an UNESCO World Heritage Site since 1993.

See also 
 List of Roman dams and reservoirs
 Roman architecture
 Roman engineering

Notes

References

Further reading

External links 
 

Roman dams in Spain
Buildings and structures in the Province of Badajoz
Gravity dams
History of Extremadura